The welterweight boxing competition at the 1980 Olympic Games in Moscow was held from 22 July to 2 August at the Olympiysky Sports Complex. 29 boxers from 29 nations competed.

Schedule

Results

Finals

Top half

Bottom half

References

Boxing at the 1980 Summer Olympics